"Wear This Ring (with Love)" is a song written by Abrim Tilmon and James Mitchell and performed by The Detroit Emeralds.  It reached #18 on the R&B chart and #91 on the Billboard Hot 100 in 1971.  The song was featured on their 1971 album, Do Me Right.

The song was produced by Katouzzion and arranged by Abrim Tilmon and Sonny Sanders.

References

1971 songs
1971 singles
The Detroit Emeralds songs